Orosia is a 1944 Spanish drama film directed by Florián Rey and starring Blanca de Silos, José Nieto and Nicolás D. Perchicot.

Synopsis 
The story begins in 1900 with the imminent wedding between Orosia Garcés de Abarca and Eloy Sancho de Embún. But her happiness will be cut short when the future husband is stabbed to death as a result of the rivalries of the nightly serenades before the bride's balcony. The neighbors suspect the quarrelsome Venancio and Joselón de Urríes, a former suitor of Orosia.

Cast
 Blanca de Silos as Orosia  
 José Nieto as Joselón  
 Nicolás D. Perchicot as Don Pablo  
 María Brú as Sabel 
 Delfín Jerez as Gracián  
 José Sepúlveda as Venancio  
 José Isbert as Don Cándido  
 Ángel Belloc as Eloy  
 Mariana Larrabeiti as Jacinta  
 Julia Lajos as Rosa  
 Antonia Plana as Doña Clara 
 Salvador Videgain as judge Don Alonso  
 Luis Pérez de León as Calixto  
 Ana María Quijada as Remigia  
 Ana de Leyva as Blasa  
 Luis Villasiul as Don Valentín  
 Lolita Valcárcel as Vicenta 
 Fernando Sancho as Mañico bronquista

References

Bibliography 
 Bentley, Bernard. A Companion to Spanish Cinema. Boydell & Brewer 2008.

External links 
 

Spanish drama films
1944 films
1940s Spanish-language films
Films directed by Florián Rey
Spanish black-and-white films
1944 drama films
1940s Spanish films